NextPage, Inc. is a direct marketing and variable data printing company located in Kansas City, Missouri. The company's customers include national franchises and organizations, and include more than 14,000 users of their "Marketing Communications Portal" product.
In February 2013, Mail Print merged with Graphic Services Printing and L&L Manufacturing to form NextPage.

Company history
NextPage was originally established in 1988 under the name Mail & More by Haver Danner. Children Eric, Gina and Kyle Danner later joined the business and transitioned it to a personalized direct marketing and commercial printing provider, under the name of Mail Print. NextPage was born in 2013 when three strong regional print providers, Mail Print, L & L Manufacturing and Graphic Services, merged to form one company.  The ownership of NextPage is Eric Danner, Gina Danner and Larry Wittmeyer, Jr.  The three had worked on projects together for over twenty years and decided that the printing landscape in the region was primed for something new. NextPage's offices and operational facility are located in the Hunt Midwest Subtropolis, an underground business complex.

Revenue & Company Growth
As of January, 2009, NextPage was listed as the 5th largest commercial printing company in the Kansas City area. Archives of the Kansas City Business Journal's yearly "Top Area Commercial Printing Companies" lists detail the following growth:

Innovations
In 2001, NextPage publicly launched their "Marketing Communications Portal," an online marketing asset management and ordering system used by organizations and franchises to create and execute direct marketing materials. Early users of the system include Reece & Nichols Realtors, a real estate brokerage with more than 60 locations and 2,000 sales agents.

NextPage began using the Hewlett-Packard line of Indigo digital presses in 2002, which allowed for variable data print personalization by integrating database information during the digital printing process. As an early adopter of the technology, NextPage served as a HP test site.

In 2007, NextPage introduced a marketing automation tool that delivered a stream of automatic sales touches on a salesperson's behalf. The automated campaigns could be initiated to a single prospect or mailing list.

Other proprietary marketing systems include "Oyster," a user interface and database for creating and producing Personalized URLs.

Customers
NextPage's customer base is made up of medium and large-size businesses and franchises, including:
 Keller Williams Realty
 Harrah's Entertainment
 Ferrellgas
 HomeServices of America companies, including Edina Realty, Reece & Nichols Realtors, and Long Realty
 Argosy Casino
 International Association of Administrative Professionals
 Fellowship of Christian Athletes
 Saint Luke's Health System

References

External links 

 NextPage company website

Digital press
Companies based in Kansas City, Missouri
Printing companies of the United States
Publishing companies established in 1988